Ruswarp village lies within the Scarborough borough of North Yorkshire, England. Originally it was called Risewarp (Old English hrīs wearp) meaning 'silted land overgrown with brushwood'.

Northern Rail serves the station and  Bus services connect the village to the surrounding area. The village is served by local shops including a butcher and a bakery, as well as a grocery store further down the street. There is a pub, the Bridge Inn and a parish church, the Church of St Bartholomew. Primary education is catered for by a local Church of England primary school. There was a Post Office opposite the butcher, but that closed down several years ago after losing the franchise, and is now converted into a private residence.

Crossing the River Esk downstream is a railway viaduct, 120 feet high, built (using 5,250,000 bricks) to carry the Scarborough-to-Whitby line, which closed in 1965. The viaduct is now owned by Sustrans and carries "The Cinder Track", a walk/cycleway along the former Whitby-to-Scarborough railway line. The River Esk was used to power corn mills in the village but the last closed in 1962. The weir that was built to channel water into a mill race has been adapted to power a hydro-electric project on its southern bank. The Ruswarp Hydro project started generating electricity in December 2012.

The village lies on the Esk Valley Walk, a national hiking trail. There is a physically undemanding walk between Ruswarp and Whitby (approximately 1½ miles) mostly along a stone pannierway, known as Monks Trod, signposted from the main street in Ruswarp.

The village also hosts one of the area's tourist attractions, Esk Leisure, which consists of Mini Monsterz Indoor Play with pottery painting and laser tag. Also at Esk Leisure is Outdoor Laser Combat and a Farm Park which previously was 9-hole Pitch and Putt golf that closed in October 2009. Opposite Esk Leisure is Ruswarp Pleasure Boats. Established in 1874 customers can rent rowing boats or canoes to explore the sheltered waters that offer a unique opportunity to access the only migratory Salmon river in Yorkshire. There is also a miniature steam railway for children and adults.

Ruswarp Village Hall caters for community events and classes.

The local Church of England parish is Whitby with Ruswarp, which falls under the boundaries of the Diocese of York and is overseen by the suffragan Bishop of Whitby.

References

External links

Ruswarp CofE School

Villages in North Yorkshire
Tourist attractions in North Yorkshire